Thiagarajah Selvanithy or (Selvi) from Sri Lanka an International PEN award winner in 1992, who was abducted and executed by the LTTE.

Biography 

Selvi was born into a peasant family in Semamadu, a village about 80 miles south of Jaffna.

Activism 
Selvi was a Tamil language poet from Jaffna in Sri Lanka. A third-year student in Theater and Drama Arts in the University of Jaffna.

She was the founder of a feminist journal called Tholi and was a gifted young poet who in her work deplored the carnage brought about by the Sri Lankan civil war. Selvi also produced two plays, one about dowry payments and the other about rapes.

Abduction 
On 30 August 1991, Selvi was arrested by the Liberation Tigers of Tamil Eelam or LTTE, a rebel group fighting for independence for minority Sri Lankan Tamil people in Sri Lanka.
The day before her abduction she was about to star in a play about the role of women in the Palestinian intifada. She was a prominent member of Poorani Illam, a women's center in Jaffna, which gives support to women traumatized by government bombing raids and bereavement.

Murder 
In 1997, LTTE sources acknowledged that she was killed along with another dissident, one Manoharan, also a final year University student. Although their opposition to the LTTE was non-violent, they were both killed in the LTTE's prison camps.

See also 
Assassinations attributed to LTTE
Human Rights in Sri Lanka
Sri Lankan civil war

References 

UTHR(J) report on Selvy's death

Year of birth missing
1997 deaths
Sri Lankan Tamil poets
Assassinated Sri Lankan activists
Kidnapped Sri Lankan people
Sri Lankan Hindus
People killed during the Sri Lankan Civil War
Kidnappings in Sri Lanka
Violence against women in Sri Lanka